Frans Zwarts (born 26 March 1949 in The Hague) was the rector magnificus (academic president) of the University of Groningen (2002–2011) and a linguist and professor in the Department of Dutch Language and Culture with a specialty in semantics. His first degree was in general linguistics at the University of Amsterdam, and his PhD was completed at the University of Groningen in 1986 with the dissertation Categoriale grammatica en algebraïsche semantiek; een onderzoek naar negatie en polariteit in het Nederlands (Categorial grammar and algebraic semantics: An investigation of negation and polarity in Dutch). He is the president of the National Dyslexia Commission and member of the Royal Netherlands Academy of Arts and Sciences (KNAW).

He is best known for his work on negation and polarity, in particular the so-called Zwarts hierarchy of polarity items. This
hierarchy recognizes three types of polarity items: weak items, acceptable in all downward-entailing contexts, strong items, acceptable in anti-additive contexts and superstrong items, acceptable in antimorphic contexts. See Zwarts (1998). Other work includes a study of the relational properties of determiners (a contribution to generalized quantifier theory), Zwarts (1983), and a paper on extraction from prepositional phrases in Dutch (Zwarts 1978). More recent work includes a number of publications on dyslexia and neurolinguistics.

Zwarts is member of the Royal Netherlands Academy of Arts and Sciences since 1999.

See also
Negative polarity

References

Zwarts, F. 1978, ‘Extractie uit prepositionele woordgroepen in het Nederlands.’ In: A. van Berkel et al. (red.), Proeven van Neerlandistiek, Aangeboden aan prof. dr. Albert Sassen. Nederlands Instituut Groningen, Groningen, pp. 303–399.   
Zwarts, F. 1983, 'Determiners: A Relational Perspective.' In Alice ter Meulen, ed., Studies in Modeltheoretic Semantics.
Foris, Dordrecht, pp. 37–62.

Zwarts, F. 1998, 'Three types of polarity items.' In Fritz Hamm and Erhard Hinrichs, eds., Plurality and Quantification.
Kluwer, Dordrecht, pp 177–238.

Stowe, L.A., Haverkort, M., & Zwarts, F., 2005, 'Rethinking the neurological basis of language.' Lingua,115, 997–1042.

References

External links
University of Groningen webpage with information on Frans Zwarts 

1949 births
Living people
Linguists from the Netherlands
Semanticists
University of Groningen alumni
University of Amsterdam alumni
Academic staff of the University of Groningen
Scientists from The Hague
Members of the Royal Netherlands Academy of Arts and Sciences